Guy Dardenne (born 19 October 1954 in Beauraing) is a retired Belgian footballer, who played as both a midfielder or forward.

During his career he played for R. Standard de Liège, R.A.A. Louviéroise, Sporting Lokeren, R.W.D. Molenbeek and Club Brugge K.V. He earned 11 caps for the Belgium national football team, and participated in UEFA Euro 1980.

Honours

Player

Club 
Standard Liège

 Belgian League Cup: 1975

International 
Belgium

 UEFA European Championship: 1980 (runners-up)
 Belgian Sports Merit Award: 1980

References

External links
 

1954 births
Living people
Footballers from Namur (province)
Belgian footballers
Belgium international footballers
UEFA Euro 1980 players
Standard Liège players
R.A.A. Louviéroise players
K.S.C. Lokeren Oost-Vlaanderen players
R.W.D. Molenbeek players
Club Brugge KV players
Belgian Pro League players
Walloon sportspeople
Association football midfielders
Association football forwards
Francs Borains players